The 2015 Liga Premier was the 12th season of the Liga Premier, the second-tier professional football league in Malaysia.

The season was held from January and concluded in August 2015.

The Liga Premier champions for 2015 season was Kedah. The champions and runners-up were both promoted to 2016 Liga Super.

Changes from last season

Team changes

To Liga Super

Promoted from 2014 Liga Premier
 PDRM
 Felda United
Relegated from 2014 Liga Super
 T-Team
 PKNS

From Liga FAM

Relegated to 2015 Liga FAM
 Perlis
 PBAPP
Promoted to 2015 Liga Premier
 Kuantan
 Kuala Lumpur

Rule changes

 A total of 4 foreign players can be registered by Liga Premier teams, including at least one player from AFC countries. A maximum of 3 foreign players can be fielded at one time in a match. The announcement was made by FAM during the exco meeting in November 2013, following a decision to upgrade the foreign players quota from 2 in 2013 to 3 in the April 2013 meeting. The Liga Premier also introduced the "home grown players" rule, which aims to encourage the development of young footballers at Liga Premier clubs. The new rule required clubs to name at least five U-21 players in their squad.

Name changes
 Negeri Sembilan were renamed to NS Matrix for sponsorship reason.

Teams
A total of 12 teams are contesting the league, including 8 sides from the 2014 season, two promoted from the 2014 Malaysia FAM League and two relegated from 2014 Liga Super.

On 27 May 2014, Kuala Lumpur earned promotion from the 2014 Malaysia FAM League. They returned to the second division after being absent for a year.  This was followed by Kuantan. The two teams replace Perlis and PBAPP who were all relegated to the 2015 Liga FAM.

T-Team and PKNS were relegated from 2014 Liga Super. They are replacing PDRM and Felda United who get promotion to 2015 Liga Super.

Team summaries

Team locations

Stadium

Personnel and sponsoring

Foreign players
The number of foreign players is restricted to four per Malaysian League team. A team can use four foreign players on the field in each game, including at least one player from the AFC country.

Note: Flags indicate national team as has been registered to the official Liga Premier. Players may hold more than one FIFA and non-FIFA nationality.

League table

Fixtures and results
Fixtures and results of the Liga Premier 2015 season.

Week 1

Week 2

Week 3

Week 4

Week 5

Week 6

Week 7

1Match delayed due to bad weather.

Week 8

Week 9

Week 10

Week 11

Week 12

Week 13

Week 14

Week 15

Season statistics

Top scorers
As of 22 October 2015.

Champions

Hat-tricks

Own goals

Scoring

 First goal of the season: Shahril Ishak for Johor Darul Ta'zim II against UiTM (6 February 2015)
 Fastest goal of the season: 1 Minute – Shahrizal Saad for NS Matrix against Kuantan (6 March 2015)
 Largest winning margin: 7 goals
 T-Team 7–0 SPA (18 August 2015)
 Highest scoring game: 8 goals
 NS Matrix 3–5 T-Team (13 March 2015)
 Most goals scored in a match by a single team: 7 goals
 T-Team 7–0 SPA (18 August 2015)
 Most goals scored in a match by a losing team: 3 goals
 NS Matrix 3–5 T-Team (13 March 2015)

Transfers
For recent transfers, see List of Malaysian football transfers 2015

See also
 2015 Liga Super
 2015 Liga FAM
 2015 Piala FA
 2015 Piala Presiden
 2015 Piala Belia

References

External links
 Football Malaysia Official Website

Malaysia Premier League seasons
2
Malay
Malay